Samuel Marsh Johnson (January 16, 1900 – August 1982) was an American football coach.  He served as the head football coach at Dickinson College in Carlisle, Pennsylvania during the 1926 season, compiling a record of 1–7–1.

References

1900 births
1982 deaths
Dickinson Red Devils football coaches